Ivar Bengt Nilsson (12 June 1933 – 26 February 2019) was a Swedish speed skater who won a bronze all-round medal at the 1962 world championships. He competed at the 1960 and 1964 Winter Olympics in 1,500 m, 5,000 m and 10,000 m events with his best achievement having been a fourth place finish in the 10,000 m event in 1960.

He was not related to his speed skating rival Jonny Nilsson.

Personal bests: 
500 m – 42.6 (1963)
1500 m – 2:10.5 (1963)
5000 m – 7:42.8 (1964)
10000 m – 16:02.9 (1963)

References

External links
 

1933 births
2019 deaths
Olympic speed skaters of Sweden
Speed skaters at the 1960 Winter Olympics
Speed skaters at the 1964 Winter Olympics
Swedish male speed skaters
World Allround Speed Skating Championships medalists
Sportspeople from Gothenburg
20th-century Swedish people